Chris Nickson (born 1954) is a British writer, novelist, music journalist, and biographer.

Biography
Nickson was born in Leeds, West Yorkshire, but lived in the United States from the age of 21, returning to the UK in 2005. As a music journalist, he specialised in world and roots music. For several years he wrote a regular column for Global Rhythm magazine, and wrote The NPR Curious Listener's Guide to World Music. He contributes interviews and reviews to several music magazines and websites.  He has written biographies of celebrities including Emma Thompson, Ewan McGregor, Mariah Carey, Soundgarden Ozzy Osbourne David Duchovney and Christopher Reeve. His biography of the late singer-songwriter John Martyn, Solid Air, published in 2006 was published as an ebook and as a paperback in June 2011.

In 2010, Nickson published his first novel, The Broken Token, set in Leeds in 1731. The next novel in the series, Cold Cruel Winter was published in the UK in May 2011 (September in the US), with the third, The Constant Lovers, published in 2012. All are part of the now longer Richard Nottingham series in the historical fiction/mystery genre. In May 2018, the Richard Nottingham series consisted of eight books, with Free from All Danger the most recent (published in February 2018).

Two books take place in Leeds in the 1950s: Dark Briggate Blues (2015) and its sequel, The New Eastgate Swing (2016); both feature private investigator Dan Markham.

Nickson's DI Tom Harper series which takes place in Leeds in the 1890s, now includes six books, with Tin God the most recent (published March 2018). According to Kirkus Reviews, this is "an excellent character-driven [police] procedural". Both series are published by Severn House.

The Chesterfield series, published by The History Press, which takes place in England of the 1360s, consisted of three books. Another series, featuring WPC Lottie Armstrong in Leeds of the 20th Century, includes two books, Modern Crimes, published in September 2017 and The Year of the Gun, in February 2018 by The History Press .

Nickson's Web site discusses two other books published by The History Press, The Dead on Leave which takes place in England in 1936 and features war veteran Detective Sergeant Urban Raven and The Hanging Psalm, the first in a new series, featuring Simon Westow, a thief-taker in Leeds in 1820. Nickson also mentions the Seattle Mysteries, Emerald City and West Seattle Blues, featuring music journalist Laura Benton, available as audio books and e-books.

Most of Nickson's novels are set in and around Leeds. In 2015, he completed Leeds, the Biography: A History of Leeds in Short Stories which was published by Armley Press.

References

Bibliography

Biographies

Soundgarden: New Metal Crown (1995), St. Martin's Griffin, 
Mariah Carey: Her Story (1995), St. Martin's Griffin, 
Brad Pitt (1995), St. Martin's Paper, 
Go, Ricki! (1996), Avon Books, 
Keanu Reeves (1996), St. Martin's Paper, 
Denzel Washington (1996), St. Martin's Paper, 
The X-Factor: The Unauthorized Biography of X-Files Superstar David Duchovny (1996), Avon Books, 
Emma: The Many Faces of Emma Thompson (1997), Taylor Publishing, 
Melissa Etheridge (1997), St. Martin's Griffin, 
Mariah Carey Revisited: The Unauthorized Biography (1998), St. Martin's Griffin, 
Superhero: A Biography of Christopher Reeve (1999), Macmillan, 
Ewan McGregor: An Unauthorized Biography (1999), Perigee,  
Will Smith (1999), St. Martin's Paper, 
Lauryn Hill: She's Got That Thing (1999), St. Martin's Paper, 
David Boreanaz: An Unauthorized Biography (1999), St. Martin's Paper, 
Matt Damon: An Unauthorized Biography (1999), Renaissance Books, 
Ozzy Knows Best: The Amazing Story of Ozzy Osbourne (2002), St. Martin's Griffin, 
Hey Ya!: The Unauthorized Biography of Outkast (2004), St. Martin's Griffin, 
Usher: The Godson of Soul (2005), Simon Spotlight, 
Solid Air: The Life of John Martyn (2011), Liaison Music, Ltd.,

Music

The NPR Curious Reader's Guide to World Music (2004), Macmillan, 
Emerald City (Audible Audio Edition) (2013), Creative Content Ltd., ASIN B00C3VAMY8
West Seattle Blues (Audible Audio Edition) (2014), Creative Content Ltd.
Emerald City (eBook Edition) (2013), Creative Content Ltd., 
West Seattle Blues (eBook Edition) (2014), Creative Content Ltd.

Historical Mysteries

The Crooked Spire (2013), The History Press, 
The following works are set in 1730s Leeds and feature Richard Nottingham, Constable of the city.
The Broken Token (2010), Creme de la Crime, 
Cold Cruel Winter (2011), Creme de la Crime, 
The Constant Lovers (2012), Creme de la Crime, 
Come the Fear (2012), Creme de la Crime, 
At the Dying of the Year (2013), Creme de la Crime, 
Convalescence (Kindle Edition) (2013), Amazon Digital Services, ASIN B00E0F9JJ4
Fair and Tender Ladies (2014), Creme de la Crime, 

British biographers
Writers of historical fiction set in the early modern period
British historical novelists
1954 births
Living people
Celebrity biographers